Jaba Papinashvili (born 18 April 1998) is a Georgian judoka.

He is the gold medallist of the 2021 Judo Grand Slam Baku in the -60 kg category. He won one of the bronze medals in his event at the 2022 Judo Grand Slam Paris held in Paris, France.

References

External links
 

1998 births
Living people
Male judoka from Georgia (country)
21st-century people from Georgia (country)